Ooops a Desi is a 2013 Hindi fast-paced drama thriller film directed by Jenner Jose. The film premiered at Times Square (US) followed by theatrical release on 23 August 2013 at major multiplexes across India. Movie received a very positive critical reception. The lack of marketing was its drawback. The film features Buali Shah, Pragathi Yadhati, Adnan Khalid and Gideon Samson as main characters.

Box office
The film opened to very good response in many metro multiplex theatres (limited release) and collected Rs. 4.2 crores on its first weekend and the total box office collections was 32 crores. The movie was made on a very small minimal budget with very limited crew, so it was in the profit territory by the first weekend itself.

Synopsis
Ooops a Desi is about Indians (Desi) living in the US on an invalid immigration status. The movie opens to a busy downtown street in New York City. The passing pedestrians notice something very alarming. It's a Desi (Indian) holding a sign, which states "BOMB here!!!". Soon we are taken to the story that occurred before this incident. Xavier, the man with the bomb sign, and Dev do odd jobs because of their illegal immigration status. They have their own troubled past that is preventing them from returning to India. The roller-coaster begins when AJ, their roommate, is mysteriously abducted to which Sonia is a witness. Because of their illegal status, Dev and Xavier along with Sonia have no option but to take matters in their own hands.

Cast
Buali Shah as Xavier
Adnan Khalid as Dev
Pragathi Yadhati as Sonia
Gideon Samson as AJ
Anil Sachdeva as Bhushan
Manohar Pinnamraju as Swami
Siddhartha Gupta as Nilesh
Javed Khalid as Patiala
Sonia Gadhok as Aarthi
 Srikanth Reddy Ponnapati (Sri ponnapati)
 Michael J. Citak as Gangster
 A.J. Rosen as Photographer

Music
Music Directors: Gugy, Gaurav H. Singh, Hardik Dave, Divyajeet Sahoo, Saurabh Malhotra, Bharat Hans, Deepak Agrawal
Singers: Gufy, Hardik Dave, Bharat Hans, Suryaveer Hooja
Lyrics: Deepak Agrawal, Leeladhar Dhote, Divyajeet Sahoo, Gaurav H. Singh, Hardik Dave

References

Ooops a desi Article
Ooops a desi Premiere
Ooops a Desi on Bollywood Hungama

External links
 Official website
 Ooops a Desi at Facebook
 
 Jenner Jose News

2013 thriller drama films
2010s Hindi-language films
Indian thriller drama films
2013 films
2013 drama films